Cave Spring High School is a public secondary school in Roanoke, Virginia.  It is under the jurisdiction of Roanoke County Public Schools. Cave Spring is one of two high schools that serve southwest Roanoke County and one of five high schools that serve the Roanoke County school district.

Communities served
Cave Spring High School is located in the eponymous Cave Spring CDP and has a jurisdiction that includes suburban areas centered around Virginia State Route 419 and rural areas along the U.S. Route 220 and U.S. Route 221 corridors. Communities served include:
Back Creek
Bent Mountain
Cave Spring
Clearbrook
Starkey
Wright

History
Cave Spring High School opened in 1956. In 1968, the high school was moved to its current site, while its original building became Cave Spring Junior High School, which would later become Cave Spring Middle School in 2002.  Cave Spring held grades 10-12 for numerous years until 2002, when it fed approximately half of its 10-12 population into Hidden Valley High School after it was completed and first opened. In 2019, the high school underwent a $43.3 million renovation, with the "new" Cave Spring opening its doors in August 2020.

Academics
According to U.S. News & World Report, Cave Spring ranks 2nd in the Roanoke Valley, 3rd in Southwest Virginia, and 52nd in the Commonwealth of Virginia in terms of academic quality. Cave Spring students are also eligible to take classes at the Roanoke Valley Governor's School for Science and Technology and the Arnold R. Burton Technology Center.

Athletics
Cave Spring athletes are known as the "Cave Spring Knights" and compete in the Virginia High School League's River Ridge District in regular season play, primarily against other schools in the Roanoke and New River Valleys. The Knights are also part of Class 3 (state classification) and Region D (for regional play), competing against similarly sized schools in Virginia.  The Knights have won multiple state titles in: volleyball (2002, 2003, 2005, 2006, 2011); cheerleading (2014, 2015, 2018, 2021); boys' basketball (2002, 2009, 2010, 2020, 2022); girls' tennis (2015, 2016, 2018); boys' swim/dive (2000, 2001); girls' gymnastics (1976, 1981); boys' soccer (2018), softball (2013), and boys' golf (1964).

Notable alumni
Gregg Marshall (1981), former Wichita State head basketball coach
George Canale (1983), Milwaukee Brewers 1st baseman
Lapthe Flora (1983), United States Army promotable to the rank of brigadier general
Tiki Barber (1993), a former New York Giants and University of Virginia running back, former NBC News anchor and co-founder of Thuzio
Ronde Barber (1993), a former Tampa Bay Buccaneers and University of Virginia cornerback
Tyler Lumsden (2001), a pitcher for the Uni-President 7-Eleven Lions
JJ Redick (2002), consensus National College Player of the Year  at Duke University and retired NBA player.
Jen Lilley (2003), an actress in The Artist, ABC's General Hospital, and MTV's Disaster Date
Danny Aiken (2006), a retired long-snapper who played in the National Football League and former University of Virginia football standout
Kevin Munson (2007), professional baseball player
Josh Woodrum (2011), former Liberty University standout and current free agent quarterback who has spent time with multiple NFL teams

References

External links
 

Public high schools in Virginia
Educational institutions established in 1956
Schools in Roanoke, Virginia
1956 establishments in Virginia